Edison Electric Band was a Philadelphia rock band of the 1970s. It was led by Mark T. Jordan  and featured bass player Freebo, who later played for Bonnie Raitt's band. It released an album for Cotillion in 1970, "Bless You, Dr. Woodward". Jordan was writer for Raitt's 1977 single "Two Lives".

"Bless You Dr. Woodward", Cotillion, 1970 
Track listing
Side one
 "Ship Of The Future" — (Mark Jordan, David "Rip" Stock) — 2:37
 "Over The Hill" — (Jordan, Joshua Rice) — 6:51
 "Please Send Me" — (Percy Mayfield) — 4:35
 "Baby Leroy" — (Rice) — 3:44
Side Two
"Rotal Fool" — (Jordan, Rice) — 3:21
 "West Wind" — (Jordan, Rice) — 3:15
 "Lonely Avenue" — (Doc Pomus) — 3:40
 "Island Sun" — (Jordan, Rice) — 3:29
 "Smokehouse" — (Stock) — 3:58
 "Lebanese Packhorse" — (T.J. Tindall) — 0:40
Personnel
Edison Electric Band
 T.J. Tindall — guitars, vocals
 Mark Jordan — piano, electric piano, Hammond organ, guitars
 Dan Friedberg — bass, acoustic guitar
 David "Rip" Stock — drums, vocals, percussion

Additional Personnel
 Norman Pride — congas (tracks 1, 8)
 Michael Ziegler — guitars (tracks 9, 10)
 The Brookmead Mumble Choir — vocals (track 9)

References

Musical groups from Philadelphia